Dan Davis (born 17 September 1998) is a Welsh rugby union player. A flanker, he plays rugby for the Scarlets. Davis is a Wales U20 international.

Club career
Davis came up through the Scarlets U16 and U18 ranks, having played for Llandeilo RFC in his youth career. He played at centre and back row, before focussing on the latter. Davis made his competitive debut on 12 November 2017 against Exeter Chiefs in the Anglo-Welsh Cup. In 2018, he scored his first try in his European debut, a late effort against Ulster.

Following his debut season in 2019, Davis signed his first professional contract with the Scarlets.

Davis was voted Supporters Player of the Month for January 2023.

International career
Previously involved with the Wales U18 team, Davis made his U20 debut in 2018.

Personal life
Davis was born in England to English parents, but moved to Wales at the age of four. Prior to playing rugby, Davis was involved in the Cardiff City F.C. academy, playing as a centre-back, before moving to rugby full-time at 13. Davis balanced his burgeoning rugby career with his studies, attaining a degree in sports science at Swansea University.

References 

1998 births
Living people
Scarlets players
Rugby union flankers
Welsh rugby union players
Rugby union players from Oxford